Air Marshal Errol John McCormack AO (born 30 August 1941) is a retired senior commander in the Royal Australian Air Force (RAAF), who served as Chief of Air Force from May 1998 to June 2001.

Early life
McCormack was born in Bundaberg, Queensland, on 30 August 1941 to Horace McCormack and his wife Ida (née Wooldridge). He was educated at Bundaberg State High School.

Service career
McCormack was commissioned in 1963 and served in Malaysia and Singapore during the Indonesia–Malaysia confrontation, and subsequently took part in the Vietnam War. He served as commanding officer of No. 1 Squadron RAAF in the 1980s. He was made commanding officer of No. 82 Wing RAAF in 1987, Director General Force Development Air at Headquarters, Australian Defence Force in Canberra in 1989 and Air Attaché in Washington D. C. in 1993. In 1995 he became Commander for the Integrated Air Defence System at Butterworth in Malaysia.

He was appointed Deputy Chief of Air Force in 1997 and Chief of Air Force in May 1998 before he retired in 2001. In retirement he became Chairman of Chemring Australia Pty Ltd.

He became an Officer of the Order of Australia in 1998.

Honours and awards

References

|-

|-

1941 births
Military personnel from Queensland
Australian aviators
Australian military personnel of the Indonesia–Malaysia confrontation
Australian military personnel of the Vietnam War
Living people
Officers of the Order of Australia
People from Bundaberg
Recipients of the Centenary Medal
Royal Australian Air Force air marshals